Owen Daniels is an American actor and television writer, best known for his roles in Space Force and Upload.

Career
As a child, Daniels also made appearances in two episodes of The Office, which (along with Space Force and Upload) was developed by his father Greg Daniels.

Filmography

Film

Television

Production credits

References

External links
 

American male television actors
American television writers
Living people
Year of birth missing (living people)
American male web series actors
21st-century American male actors
Place of birth missing (living people)